Rhabdaerophilum calidifontis is a species of Alphaproteobacteria.

References

Hyphomicrobiales